Jennifer Lee Bendery (born 1974) is an American political journalist whose focus has been on Capitol Hill, including coverage of U.S. policy regarding women and minorities – particularly Savanna's Act and the Violence Against Women Act.

Career 
From 1996 to 1998, Bendery was Health Care Policy Reporter for the Manisses Communications Group in Providence, Rhode Island. From 1999 to 2002, she was marketing/promotions manager in San Francisco for Jossey-Bass/John Wiley & Sons (religion & nonprofit book series). From 2003 to 2007, she covered the Texas Legislature for GalleryWatch, Austin Bureau. During that period, Bendery, in 2005, completed an M.A. degree in English literature at San Francisco State University. From 2007 to 2011, she was a Congressional and White House staff reporter for Roll Call.  Since 2011, Bendery has written for the HuffPost, where she is currently (as of April 2021) Senior Politics Reporter.

Selected articles 

 January 29, 2020, Bendery authored a story in the HuffPost that included a list of U.S. House and Senate members who had tested positive for COVID-19.
 April 20, 2021, Bendery broke the story in the HuffPost that Congressman Jeff Fortenberry made emergency calls to the U.S. Capitol Police to test response time. The exercise roused the ire of Capitol Police personnel.

Bendery's subjects 

 Affirmative action
 Discrimination
 Employment Non-Discrimination Act
 Gender inequality
 Human Rights Campaign
 Paycheck Fairness Act
 Racial inequality
 Savanna's Act
 Violence Against Women Act

Bendery has authored articles criticizing aspects of the following:

 Alliance Defending Freedom
 Center for Security Policy

Professional affiliations 
 President, . Before her current role as President, she served as co-chair of the Congressional Dinner committee for two years and Vice President for two years.

Family 
Bendery, by way of her mother – Margaret Bendery ( Margaret Whitcomb) – is a niece of journalist Robert Bassett Whitcomb, Jr. (born 1947) of The Providence Journal.

Bibliography

Annotations

Notes

References 

  (bio summary).
<li> 
<li> 
<li> 

 

 

 

  (bio summary).

References authored by Bendery 

 
 
 
 

1974 births
Living people
Political journalists
American women journalists
American political writers
21st-century American journalists
21st-century American non-fiction writers
21st-century American women writers
San Francisco State University alumni
University of Mary Washington alumni
People from Annandale, Virginia